Młodzianów may refer to the following places in Poland:
Młodzianów, Lower Silesian Voivodeship (south-west Poland)
Młodzianów, Greater Poland Voivodeship (west-central Poland)